Count Pavel Sergeevich Potemkin, also Potyomkin, (1743-1796) was a Russian statesman, soldier, and writer.

He was a cousin of Prince Grigory Potemkin, a well-known military and political figure of Empress Catherine the Great’s Russia. He took part in the wars with the rebel adventurer Yemelyan Pugachev, the Ottoman Empire, and the Bar Confederation. He signed the Treaty of Georgievsk with King Heraclius II of Georgia in 1783.

References 
Потемкин Павел Сергеевич. Russian Biographic Lexicon.

1743 births
1796 deaths
Russian generals
Pavel
Russian people of the Kościuszko Uprising
Recipients of the Order of St. George of the Second Degree
Recipients of the Order of St. George of the Third Degree
Imperial Moscow University alumni